Ivan Milosavljević may refer to:
 Ivan Milosavljević (footballer, born 1983)
 Ivan Milosavljević (footballer, born 2000)